Hope School may refer to:

in New Zealand
Hope School (Tasman), Tasman, New Zealand

in the United States
(by state)
Hope Street School, Woonsocket, Rhode Island, listed on the NRHP in Rhode Island
 Hope Rosenwald School, also known as Hope School, near Pomaria, South Carolina, listed on the National Register of Historic Places

See also
New Hope School (disambiguation)